are ogres or demons in Japanese folklore.

Oni  may also refer to:
 ONI (Oxford Nanoimaging), a super-resolution microscope company
 Oni (band), a Canadian progressive metal band
 Oni Press, an independent comic book publisher
 Ooni, the kings of Nigeria's Yoruba people
 Miye Oni (born 1997), American basketball player
 Oni Gozen, a Japanese female warrior from the 16th century
 Oni, India, a small village in Western India
 Oni, Georgia, a town in Georgia
 Oni (letter), the 16th letter of the three Georgian scripts
 Oni: Thunder God's Tale, stop-motion series
 Oni (video game), a 2001 third-person action video game made by Bungie
 Onimusha (series), a series of action video games made by Capcom
 Oni Aliens, foes in the Gantz manga
 Oni, the title of an unfinished Akira Kurosawa script that was later adapted to a video game named Ni-Oh
 Oni, a race of aliens from the manga and anime Urusei Yatsura
 Oni, a primary antagonist in seasons 8-10 of Ninjago: Masters of Spinjitzu 
 Oni, an alternate form of Akuma that appears in the Super Street Fighter IV: Arcade Edition video game
 Oni, an antagonist character on the Mortal Kombat: Shaolin Monks video game

ONI may refer to:
 Office of Naval Intelligence, the United States Navy's intelligence agency
 Office of National Intelligence, an Australian government intelligence agency
 OpenNet Initiative, a project for tracking the use of internet filtering and surveillance
 ONI Systems Corporation, an optical networking company acquired by Ciena Corporation in 2002
 Oxygen Not Included, a simulation video game by Klei Entertainment
 OASIS Neural Interface, a VR technology system used in Ready Player Two